Krisztina Nagy is a female former international table tennis player from Hungary.

Table tennis career
She won a bronze medal for Hungary at the 1987 World Table Tennis Championships in the Corbillon Cup (women's team event) with Csilla Bátorfi, Szilvia Káhn and Edit Urban.

See also
 List of World Table Tennis Championships medalists

References

Hungarian female table tennis players
World Table Tennis Championships medalists